Bossam (褓-) is a pork dish in Korean cuisine. It usually consists of pork shoulder that is boiled in spices and thinly sliced. The meat is served with side dishes such as spicy radish salad, sliced raw garlic, ssamjang (wrap sauce), saeu-jeot (salted shrimp), kimchi, and ssam (wrap) vegetables such as lettuce, kkaennip (perilla leaves), and inner leaves of a napa cabbage.

Bossam is a popular dish in South Korea, often served as anju (i.e. food accompanying alcoholic drinks). To eat, the meat and side dishes are wrapped together in ssam vegetables, hence the literal meaning of bossam: "wrapped" or "packaged".

History 
Bossam is traditionally linked with the process of gimjang, during which large quantities of kimchi are prepared for winters. To ensure the commitment of the workers during this labor-intensive process, yangban (scholar-gentry of the Joseon era) would deliver a pig for a feast. The workers would enjoy boiled pork with some of their newly made kimchi, which, being early in the fermentation process, was a fresh and crispy complement to the soft pork of bossam.

Preparation 
Although beef can also be used, pork is preferred for bossam. In the case of pork, pork neck is less fat and lighter than pork belly, so it is better to make bossam. The meat is tied with kitchen twine to hold its shape, and boiled in a broth that contains star anise, ginger, white part and root of scallion, garlic, doenjang (soybean paste), coffee powder, tea leaves, and so on, to reduce the gaminess. When cooked, it is rinsed with cold water, untied, and pressed lightly in a cotton cloth to maintain its shape.

If the meat is served with fresh raw oyster, the dish is called gul-bossam ("oyster bossam").

Gallery

See also 

 
 Jokbal
 Ssam

References

External links

Korean pork dishes